Marlies Stegemann (born 12 January 1951) is a German gymnast. She competed in six events at the 1968 Summer Olympics.

References

1951 births
Living people
German female artistic gymnasts
Olympic gymnasts of West Germany
Gymnasts at the 1968 Summer Olympics
Sportspeople from Bochum